The second season of the Chinese reality talent show Sing! China premiered on 14 July 2017 on Zhejiang Television. Jay Chou and Na Ying returned as coaches. Eason Chan and Liu Huan replaced Wang Feng and Harlem Yu as coaches. The show is hosted by Hu Qiaohua, who had previously hosted the finals in the last season and replaced Li Yong, who left after just one season.

On 8 October, Tashi Phuntsok 扎西平措 of Team Liu Huan was announced as the winner of the season, making him the oldest winner of the series. Doris Guo 郭沁 of Team Na Ying was the runner-up. Joanna Dong 董姿彦 of Team Jay finished in third place, while Team Eason's Ye Xiaoyue 叶晓粤 and Xiao Kaiye 肖凯晔 finished in fourth and fifth place respectively.

Coaches and hosts

On 24 November 2016, Jay Chou was confirmed to be returning for his second season. Eason Chan was also announced to join the show as a new coach, which effectively confirmed that there would be changes to the coaching panel with at least one of the coaches from the previous season exiting the show. On 8 December, it was claimed by an unknown media outlet that Liu Huan, who was formerly a coach on The Voice of China, would also be joining the show as a coach. Lu Wei, the show's publicity director, later refuted the claim. On 28 March 2017, Na Ying was confirmed to be returning for her second season. A month later, on 28 April, Wang Feng issued a statement via his management to announce his departure from the show to focus on his music career, but hinted a possibility of returning in the future seasons. On the same day following Wang's announcement, a photo showing a promotional banner that was claimed to have set up at one of the show's preliminary auditions began to circulate online. The banner in question revealed Liu as part of the coaching lineup, together with the other three coaches who have all been confirmed to join the show. With this, Liu was once again rumoured to be joining the show to fill the final seat on the coaching panel. Lu once again refuted the claim, stating that the promotional banner is "fake", and the team has yet to finalise on the selection of the final coach. However, despite the constant denial from Lu, Liu was announced on 19 May as the fourth coach to join the show, via one of the show's promotional video. Harlem Yu was therefore confirmed to have left the show.

Up till the airing of the premiere episode, it was not revealed who would take on the hosting role for the second season. It was previously rumoured that Li Yong would not return for his second season and be replaced by Shen Tao, a host from Zhejiang Television. On 14 July, Hu Qiaohua was revealed as the host on the premiere episode for the season, with Li exiting the show. The thirteenth and fourteenth episodes were hosted by Shen and Yi Yi.

Teams
 Colour key

Blind auditions 
The taping of the blind auditions began on 5 June and ended on 20 July. In the blind auditions, the coaches are to recruit nine artists to form a team of their own. Coaches may also recruit more than nine artists during the blind auditions, but to ensure equal representation across all the teams, they are required to cut their team down to nine artists before moving on to the Round-Robin Battle rounds. At the end of the blind auditions, Jay Chou and Na Ying each recruited nine artists to their teams, while 12 and 13 artists joined the teams of Eason Chan and Liu Huan respectively. Therefore, a total of seven artists (three from Team Eason and four from Team Liu Huan) were eliminated by their coaches and did not advance to the Round-Robin Battle rounds.

This season saw the introduction of the team badges and flags, which are specially designed by the coaches themselves. When an artist is defaulted or elected to join a coach's team, the respective coach's team flag would be lowered on stage, with the coach going forward to present the artist with the team badge as a signification of their addition to the team. The coach's respective victory songs ("谢谢侬" for Chan, "春暖花开" for Na, "千万次的问" for Liu, and "霍元甲" for Chou) would also be played in the background.

 Colour key

Episode 1 (14 July)
The four coaches performed a medley of each other's songs – Eason Chan and Na Ying performed "天地在我心", Jay Chou & Liu Huan performed a medley of "一笑而过" and "你的背包", Chan & Chou performed a medley of "印第安老斑鸠" and "谢谢侬", Chou and Na performed "因为爱情", Chan and Liu performed "菊花台", Liu and Na performed "过把瘾" – and concluded the performances with "沧海一声笑".

Episode 2 (21 July)
Eason Chan auditioned as a joke with one of his signature songs "十年", with all three other coaches pressing their buttons for him.

Episode 3 (28 July)

Episode 4 (4 August)

Episode 5 (11 August)

The Round-Robin Battles
The post-blind auditions stage of the competition kicked off with the round-robin Battle rounds, a competition format modified from the Cross Fighting rounds featured in the previous season. Dubbed as the "six-dimensional round-robin battles", the competition would see all four coaches going head-to-head against one another in the all-play-all format, with each coach facing off with every other coach in separate Battle rounds. In each round, the two coaches involved would randomly pick an artist from their personal team. The two selected artists would then perform and receive votes of approval from a 51-person panel. The artist with the most votes in each Battle rounds would advance to the Playoffs, while the other would be eliminated. The eliminated artist would lose their personal team badge and had to pass it on to a surviving team member. The team flag of the winning artist would then be lowered on stage with the team's victory song playing in the background.

Each coach would be allowed to save one losing artist from their team by pressing the button on their chair before the artist leaves the stage. The saved artists would then perform again in the "coach's save" round, with the one receiving the most votes moving on to the Playoffs. Coach's saves that are not used by the coaches by the end of the three-week round-robin Battles would be forfeited.

The round-robin Battle rounds were taped on 7, 8, and 13 August.

 Colour key

The Playoffs
The Top 19 performed in the Playoff rounds for a spot in the finals. The format of the Playoff rounds for this season was reverted to the one used for the first three seasons of The Voice of China, which saw the remaining artists competing against their fellow team members instead of artists from other teams. At the end of the Playoffs, each coach will crown one artist as their team winner, who will later represent them in the finals. Coach Eason Chan crowned two team winners, instead of one, as he had the most artists (seven) competing in the Playoffs. The competition was split into two rounds — the Knockouts and the Final Showdown. 

In the Knockout rounds, the teams would be split into groups of two (or three for one of Team Eason's Knockout rounds). Each Knockout pairing will see the artists competing against each other via duet performances with celebrity guests. The two artists will then receive votes of approval from a 51-person panel. The other three non-competitive coaches were also given two votes each, which they have to cast for one of the artists in the knockout pairing. The artist with the most votes will advance to the Final Showdown, while the other would be eliminated.

In the Final Showdown, the remaining artists will perform a solo song against their fellow team member. Similar to the Knockout rounds, the artists will receive votes of approval from a 51-person panel at the end of the performances. On top of the votes given by the panel, their respective coaches were also given 50 votes each, which they have to allocate to their own remaining artists at their discretion. The artist with the most votes will be crowned as the team winner and advance to the finals, while the other would be eliminated.

The Playoff rounds were taped on 29 August, 12, 13, and 14 September for Team Na Ying, Team Eason, Team Jay, and Team Liu Huan respectively.

 Colour key

  Jay Chou chose not to vote for any of the artists.
  Na Ying chose to abstain from voting.
  In the special three-person knockout, Jeslyn Khoo 古洁縈 first faced off with Ye Xiaoyue 叶晓粤. With Ye advancing to the final showdown after receiving a higher number of accumulated votes, Khoo later faced off with Yu Zibei 于梓贝, thus receiving two sets of panel and coach votes.
  Na Ying was not allowed to vote for any of the artists as she was the duet partner for Darren 达布希勒图.

Finals
The Top 5 performed live in a two-part season finale on 8 October, held at the Beijing National Stadium. In the first round of the competition, the five finalists performed a duet with their coach, and a solo song. Based on the public votes received from the live audience at the end of the first round, the bottom three artists with the fewest votes would be eliminated.

The final two artists would then sing their winner's song before a 101-person panel and live audience, who will vote for the winner at the end of the performances. Every member of the panel would be entitled to one vote, and the total number of votes received by the artists from the panel and live audience would be converted into percentage points accordingly. The artist who received the highest number of points would be announced as the winner.

  Before the start of the solo performances in the first round, it was revealed that Doris Guo 郭沁 and Joanna Dong 董姿彦 were leading in the number of public votes.

Non-competition shows

The Mid-Autumn Special (4 October)
The thirteenth episode was a two-hour special aired on 4 October, featuring performances by the coaches and artists in celebration of the Mid-Autumn Festival. The episode was taped on 15 September.

The National Day Special (5 October)
The fourteenth episode was a two-hour special episode aired on 5 October, featuring performances by the coaches and artists from the current and past seasons in celebration of the National Day of the People's Republic of China. The episode was taped on 1 September 2017, at the Cotai Arena.

 Colour key

Reception

CSM52 ratings

References

2017 in Chinese music
2017 Chinese television seasons